Koenigia phytolaccifolia (synonym Aconogonon phytolaccifolium) is a species of flowering plant in the knotweed family, known by the common name poke knotweed.

Description
The lance-shaped or pointed oval leaves are 10 to 20 centimeters long and borne on petioles. The inflorescence is a long array of branching cluster of many white or greenish flowers.

Distribution
Koenigia phytolaccifolia is native to the western United States: California, Oregon, Washington, Nevada, Idaho, and Montana.

References

External links
SEINet, Southwestern Biodiversity, Arizona Chapter photos of herbarium specimens

Polygonoideae
Flora of the Western United States
Plants described in 1872
Flora without expected TNC conservation status